Minksia is a genus of lichen-forming fungi of uncertain familial placement in the order Arthoniales. The genus was circumscribed by Swiss lichenologist Johannes Müller Argoviensis in 1882 with Minksia caesiella assigned as the type species.

The genus name of Minksia is in honour of Arthur Minks (1846-1908), who was a German doctor and botanist (Mycology and Lichenology), who worked in Stettin..

Species
Minksia alba  – India
Minksia caesiella 
Minksia candida 
Minksia irregularis 
Minksia saxicola 

Minksia angolensis  is now known as Tremotylium angolense.

Minksia chilena  is now Carbacanthographis chilensis (family Graphidaceae).

References

Arthoniomycetes
Arthoniomycetes genera
Lichen genera
Taxa described in 1883
Taxa named by Johannes Müller Argoviensis